"Nights on Broadway" is a song by the Bee Gees from the Main Course album released in 1975. The second single released from the album, it immediately followed their number-one hit "Jive Talkin'". This track was credited to Barry, Robin and Maurice Gibb.

Recording
Recording this track started on 20 January 1975 and continued on 30 January, when they started to record songs for the album: "Jive Talkin'" (finished 2 February), "Songbird", "Fanny (Be Tender with My Love)" (finished 19 February), "All This Making Love" and "Edge of the Universe".

Producer Arif Mardin asked if one of the Bee Gees members could do some screaming during the main chorus to make the song more exciting. In response, Barry Gibb began singing higher and higher, eventually singing it in a falsetto that was unexpectedly powerful. He had never known he had such an ability and Barry's falsetto became a trademark of the Bee Gees, although Maurice had been harmonizing in falsetto for years. Barry recalled in a May 2001 interview with Mojo magazine: "Arif said to me, 'Can you scream?' I said, 'under certain circumstances'. He said, 'Can you scream in tune?' I said, 'well, I'll try' ".

Barry Gibb talked about "Nights on Broadway" on The Larry King Show on 2 February 2002:

"It came to me in a dream, there was a request by Arif Mardin, who was like an uncle to us, he was a great record producer during the song 'Nights On Broadway,' for the Main Course album, which is previous to the 'Fever' syndrome. And he said, 'Can any of you scream, scream in falsetto.' So, you know, give us an ad lib or a scream at the end. So from screaming, it turned into things like blaming it all."

Release
"Nights on Broadway" reached number seven on the American Billboard Hot 100 singles chart. The single was edited for radio airplay, removing the slow section; it fades at 2:52. The version of this song on Tales from the Brothers Gibb is faster than the album, and fades at 4:25. The 45 was also faster and runs 4:26.

Cash Box called it a "hard-hitting r&b effort," saying that "the Gibbs brothers wrap more incredible harmonies around the rock and roll mind."

Chart performance

Weekly charts

Year-end charts

Candi Staton version
In 1977, Candi Staton released a version of this song that peaked at no. 6 on the United Kingdom Singles Chart in late Summer of that year and at no. 4 in Ireland.

References

1975 songs
1975 singles
Bee Gees songs
RSO Records singles
Songs about New York City
Songs written by Barry Gibb
Songs written by Maurice Gibb
Songs written by Robin Gibb
Song recordings produced by Arif Mardin